Akbarabad (also Romanized as Akbarābād) is a village in Salehan Rural District, in the Central District of Khomeyn County, Markazi Province, Iran. At the 2006 census, its population was 33, in 11 families.

References 

Populated places in Khomeyn County